Castrignano del Capo is a town and comune in the province of Lecce in the Apulia region of south-east Italy. It has three Villages: Santa Maria di Leuca, Giuliano, Salignano.

See also
Angelo Buccarello

References

Cities and towns in Apulia
Localities of Salento